R727 road may refer to:
 R727 road (Ireland)
 R727 road (South Africa)